David del Toro Jiménez (born 28 May 1997), known as David Toro, is a Spanish footballer who plays for CD San Roque de Lepe as a forward.

Club career
Born in La Algaba, Seville, Andalusia, Toro represented Real Betis as a youth. On 28 January 2016, he was loaned to Tercera División side CD Cabecense until June, and made his senior debut three days later in a 2–1 home win against Conil CF.

Toro scored his first senior goal on 14 February 2016, netting the equalizer in a 2–1 home success over UB Lebrijana. In August, he joined fellow league team CD Gerena.

On 31 January 2017, Toro signed a two-and-a-half-year deal with Cádiz CF, being initially assigned to the reserves. He made his first team debut on 17 September, coming on as a late substitute for Aitor García in a 0–1 away loss against Real Oviedo in the Segunda División championship.

On 31 August 2018, Toro was loaned to Segunda División B side Barakaldo CF for the season. After playing only two games for the club, the parties decided to terminate the loan deal on 2 November, and he returned to Cádiz. On 17 January 2019, Toro was loaned out to Atlético Sanluqueño CF until the end of the season.

References

External links

David Toro at Cadistas1910 

1997 births
Living people
People from Vega del Guadalquivir
Sportspeople from the Province of Seville
Spanish footballers
Footballers from Andalusia
Association football forwards
Segunda División players
Tercera División players
CD Gerena players
Cádiz CF B players
Cádiz CF players
Barakaldo CF footballers
Atlético Sanluqueño CF players
San Fernando CD players
CD San Roque de Lepe footballers